Enrique Figueroa Freyre (September 26, 1926 – April 25, 1986), nicknamed "Tite", was a Puerto Rican pitcher in the Negro leagues.

A native of Mayagüez, Puerto Rico, Figueroa was the brother of fellow Negro leaguer Tito Figueroa. He pitched for the Baltimore Elite Giants in 1946. Figueroa died in Mayagüez in 1986 at age 59.

References

External links
 and Seamheads

1926 births
1986 deaths
Baltimore Elite Giants players
People from Mayagüez, Puerto Rico
Baseball pitchers
Puerto Rican baseball players